The Thomas County Courthouse is an historic government building built in 1858 and located on North Broad Street in Thomasville, Georgia, the seat of Thomas County.  It was designed by architect John Wind.

It was added to the National Register of Historic Places on June 22, 1970.

It is also a contributing building in the NRHP-listed Thomasville Commercial Historic District.

See also
National Register of Historic Places listings in Thomas County, Georgia

References

County courthouses in Georgia (U.S. state)
Courthouses on the National Register of Historic Places in Georgia (U.S. state)
Clock towers in Georgia (U.S. state)
Buildings and structures in Thomas County, Georgia
National Register of Historic Places in Thomas County, Georgia